Below is the list of the 122nd Maine Senate, which was sworn into office on December 1, 2004 and left office in December 2006.

On December 1, Beth Edmonds (D-Cumberland) and Paul Davis (R-Piscataquis) were nominated for President of the Maine Senate. After a secret ballot, Edmonds was elected Senate President.

Current Leadership

Senators

See also
List of members of the Maine State House of Representatives

External links
Maine Senate

References

Maine legislative sessions
2000s in Maine
2004 in Maine
2005 in Maine
2006 in Maine